The Monastery of Sendomir (German: Das Kloster von Sendomir) is a 1919 German silent drama film directed by Rudolf Meinert and starring Ellen Richter, Ernst Deutsch and Eduard von Winterstein. The film is based on an 1828 short story of the same title by Franz Grillparzer. The following year the story was turned into a Swedish film The Monastery of Sendomir.

The main part of the film is told in a flashback by a monk to two visiting noblemen on their way to Warsaw in the 17th century. He tells them how a mighty count named Starschensky once ruled Sendomir (Sandomierz), but after an intrigue in which his wife was unfaithful with her own cousin he had to use all his resources to build the monastery where they are now staying. At the end it is revealed that the monk is in fact Starschensky himself.

Cast
 Ellen Richter - Elga von Laschek 
 Ernst Deutsch   
 Eduard von Winterstein
 Max Kronert   
 Leopold Bauer   
 Hugo Falke   
 Hella Thornegg

See also
Confessions of a Monk (1922)

Bibliography
 Bergfelder, Tim & Bock, Hans-Michael. The Concise Cinegraph: Encyclopedia of German. Berghahn Books, 2009.

External links

1919 films
Films of the Weimar Republic
German silent feature films
German drama films
Films directed by Rudolf Meinert
Films based on short fiction
Films based on works by Franz Grillparzer
1919 drama films
German black-and-white films
Films set in the 17th century
Films set in Poland
Silent drama films
1910s German films
1910s German-language films